Gateway is a town in Benton County, Arkansas, United States. The population was 405 at the 2010 census, up from 116 in 2000. It is part of the Northwest Arkansas region. The town's name reflects its situation as the "gateway" to and from Arkansas.

Geography
Gateway is located in northeastern Benton County at  (36.486000, -93.938253), along the Missouri border. U.S. Route 62 passes through the town, leading east to Eureka Springs and Berryville and southwest to Rogers. Arkansas Highway 37 leads north to the Missouri line, where Missouri Route 37 continues north to Seligman and Cassville, Missouri.

Demographics

As of the census of 2000, there were 116 people, 43 households, and 30 families residing in the town. The racial makeup of the town was 96.55% White and 3.45% Native American.

There were 43 households, out of which 39.5% had children under the age of 18 living with them, 62.8% were married couples living together, 2.3% had a female householder with no husband present, and 30.2% were non-families. 20.9% of all households were made up of individuals, and 7.0% had someone living alone who was 65 years of age or older. The average household size was 2.70 and the average family size was 3.27.

In the town, the population was spread out, with 26.7% under the age of 18, 12.1% from 18 to 24, 25.9% from 25 to 44, 28.4% from 45 to 64, and 6.9% who were 65 years of age or older. The median age was 38 years. For every 100 females, there were 107.1 males. For every 100 females age 18 and over, there were 117.9 males.

The median income for a household in the town was $32,679, and the median income for a family was $45,625. Males had a median income of $41,875 versus $33,958 for females. The per capita income for the town was $16,557. There were 9.1% of families and 10.1% of the population living below the poverty line, including none under 18 and 50.0% of those over 65.

Education 
Public education for early childhood, elementary, and secondary school students is provided by two different school districts, depending on the area: Rogers Public Schools and Pea Ridge School District. The latter operates Pea Ridge High School.

References

Towns in Benton County, Arkansas
Towns in Arkansas
Northwest Arkansas